Calvin Township is a township in Jewell County, Kansas, USA.  As of the 2000 census, its population was 65.

Geography
Calvin Township covers an area of 31.43 square miles (81.4 square kilometers); of this, 0.01 square miles (0.04 square kilometers) or 0.05 percent is water.

Adjacent townships
 Center Township (north)
 Washington Township (northeast)
 Buffalo Township (east)
 Browns Creek Township (south)
 Athens Township (southwest)
 Ionia Township (west)
 Limestone Township (northwest)

Cemeteries
The township contains one cemetery, McGehee.

Major highways
 K-14
 K-28

References
 U.S. Board on Geographic Names (GNIS)
 United States Census Bureau cartographic boundary files

External links
 US-Counties.com
 City-Data.com

Townships in Jewell County, Kansas
Townships in Kansas